Sonalben Manubhai Patel is an international Para table tennis player and Asian medalist from Viramgam, Gujarat, India.

Career 
She is participating in wheelchair class 3 para table tennis. She is making her Paralympic debut in Tokyo Paralympic 2020.

Ms. Lakhia from Blind People's Association, Ahmedabad encouraged her to take up Table Tennis and she soon began to train professionally under the guidance of her coach Nilay Vyas
In the 2022 Birmingham Commonwealth Games, she won the bronze medal in the women's singles by defeating England's Sue Bailey.

Personal life 
She was diagnosed with polio when she was 6 months old, which later affected both her legs and right hand and left her with 90% disability.

See also 

 India at the Paralympics
 Table tennis at the 2020 Summer Paralympics

References 

Living people
1987 births
Indian female table tennis players
Gujarati people
Sportswomen from Gujarat
Racket sportspeople from Gujarat
People from Ahmedabad district
Table tennis players at the 2020 Summer Paralympics
Paralympic table tennis players of India
Table tennis players at the 2022 Commonwealth Games
Commonwealth Games medallists in table tennis
Commonwealth Games bronze medallists for India
Medallists at the 2022 Commonwealth Games